Martin David Singleton (born 2 August 1963) is an English former professional footballer who played as a midfielder.

Career
Born in Banbury, Singleton played for Banbury United, Coventry City, Bradford City, West Bromwich Albion, Northampton Town, Walsall, Worcester City and Aylesbury United.

He also played for England Youth.

References

1963 births
Living people
English footballers
Banbury United F.C. players
Coventry City F.C. players
Bradford City A.F.C. players
West Bromwich Albion F.C. players
Northampton Town F.C. players
Walsall F.C. players
Worcester City F.C. players
Aylesbury United F.C. players
English Football League players
Association football midfielders
Sportspeople from Banbury
England youth international footballers